Ligilactobacillus is a genus of lactic acid bacteria associated with vertebrate hosts, formed through the 2020 division of the Lactobacillus genus. Most of these homofermentative species are motile and express urease to survive gastric acids, making them popular choices for probiotics. The G/C content of this genus varies between 32.5-43.3%.

Species
The genus Ligilactobacillus comprises the following species:
 Ligilactobacillus acidipiscis (Tanasupawat et al. 2000) Zheng et al. 2020
 Ligilactobacillus agilis (Weiss et al. 1982) Zheng et al. 2020
 Ligilactobacillus animalis (Dent and Williams 1983) Zheng et al. 2020
 Ligilactobacillus apodemi (Osawa et al. 2006) Zheng et al. 2020
 Ligilactobacillus araffinosus (Fujisawa et al. 1986) Zheng et al. 2020
 Ligilactobacillus aviarius (Fujisawa et al. 1985) Zheng et al. 2020
 Ligilactobacillus ceti (Vela et al. 2008) Zheng et al. 2020
 Ligilactobacillus equi (Morotomi et al. 2002) Zheng et al. 2020
 Ligilactobacillus faecis (Endo et al. 2013) Zheng et al. 2020
 Ligilactobacillus hayakitensis (Morita et al. 2007) Zheng et al. 2020
 Ligilactobacillus murinus (Hemme et al. 1982) Zheng et al. 2020
 Ligilactobacillus pabuli Tohno et al. 2022
 Ligilactobacillus pobuzihii (Chen et al. 2010) Zheng et al. 2020
 Ligilactobacillus ruminis (Sharpe et al. 1973) Zheng et al. 2020
 Ligilactobacillus saerimneri (Pedersen and Roos 2004) Zheng et al. 2020
 Ligilactobacillus salitolerans (Tohno et al. 2019) Zheng et al. 2020
 Ligilactobacillus salivarius (Rogosa et al. 1953) Zheng et al. 2020

Phylogeny
The currently accepted taxonomy is based on the List of Prokaryotic names with Standing in Nomenclature and the phylogeny is based on 16S rRNA sequences using Lactobacillus acidophilus ATCC 4356 as an outgroup.

References

Lactobacillaceae
Bacteria genera